Kirchspielslandgemeinde Hennstedt was an Amt ("collective municipality") in the district Dithmarschen in Schleswig-Holstein, in northern Germany. Its administration was in the village Hennstedt. In January 2008, it was merged with the Ämter Kirchspielslandgemeinde Lunden and Kirchspielslandgemeinde Tellingstedt to form the Amt Kirchspielslandgemeinden Eider.

It consisted of the following municipalities (with population in 2005):

 Barkenholm (189)
 Bergewöhrden (36)
 Delve (737)
 Fedderingen (277)
 Glüsing (119)
 Hägen (54)
 Hennstedt (1,880)
 Hollingstedt (338)
 Kleve (452)
 Linden (876)
 Norderheistedt (144)
 Schlichting (239)
 Süderheistedt (542)
 Wiemerstedt (165)

Former Ämter in Schleswig-Holstein